Joan Levy Specter (born January 1, 1934) is an American businesswoman and politician. She is a former member of the Philadelphia City Council, and the widow of former U.S. Senator Arlen Specter.

Professional career
Specter holds a BA from Southern Connecticut College and an MA in food and design from Drexel University. Upon her graduation from Drexel, she founded several cooking schools in the Philadelphia-area. In the 1970s, she hosted a consumer advice and food-related program on a local radio station, and wrote a weekly column for the Philadelphia Bulletin. Specter also began selling her pies to local restaurants. Eventually, the business grew into a wholesale distribution company which operated in several dozen states. Specter's pies were billed as "America's first gourmet frozen pies which require no baking, decorating or special preparations".

Political career
Specter left the business world in 1979, when she was elected to one of the two allotted minority Republican Party at-large seats on the Philadelphia City Council. She was re-elected three more times, though she finished third in the 1991 primary, behind her colleague on Council, W. Thacher Longstreth and Joseph Egan Jr. However, prior to the general election, former Democratic Mayor Frank Rizzo, who had switched to the Republican Party and was its nominee in that year's Mayoral election, died. Egan was subsequently selected to take Rizzo's spot on the ballot (and lost to former District Attorney Ed Rendell), and Longstreth and Specter were both re-elected.

In 1995, she and Longstreth were challenged by two high-profile Republicans–Rizzo's son, Frank Jr. and former Congressman Charles Dougherty. While Longstreth survived the challenge, Specter lost her seat to Rizzo, and she left City Council the following January.

Personal life

Specter was married to her husband, Arlen, from 1953 until his death in 2012. The couple has two sons, Shanin and Dr. Stephen E. Specter. Specter currently resides in  Haverford, Pennsylvania.

References

Living people
Philadelphia City Council members
Southern Connecticut State University alumni
Drexel University alumni
1934 births
Pennsylvania Republicans
Women city councillors in Pennsylvania
21st-century American women
20th-century American politicians
20th-century American women politicians